Conscript or Conscription may refer to:

 Constructed script
 The Conscript, a 1974 Belgian film
 Conscription, the process of drafting a country's population into involuntary labour.
 The ConScript Unicode Registry for coordinating Unicode private-use area assignments.
 Conscript, basic infantry for the Soviet Union in Command & Conquer: Red Alert 2
 Conscript, basic infantry for the Soviet Union in Empires: Dawn of the Modern World